Steve Levitt may refer to:
 Steve Levitt (actor) (born 1960), American actor
 Steven Levitt (born 1967), economist